The Mixed 5 km Team Relay competition of the 2020 European Aquatics Championships was held on 15 May 2021.

Results
The race was started at 14:30.

References

Team
European Aquatics Championships